Adolf Bohlin (born 1873), Swedish missionary
 Allan Bohlin (1907–1959), Swedish film actor
 Birger Bohlin (1898–1990), Swedish palaeontologist 
 Britt Bohlin Olsson (born 1956), Swedish social democratic politician
 Ella Bohlin (born 1979), Christian Democratic politician in Sweden 
 Erik Bohlin (1897–1977), Swedish road racing cyclist
 Folke Bohlin (sailor) (1903–1972), Swedish sailor
 Folke Bohlin (musicologist) (born 1931), Swedish musicologist
 Kjell Bohlin (1928–2011), Norwegian politician
 Nils Bohlin (1920–2002), Swedish inventor
 Peter Bohlin (born 1937), American architect
 Ragnar Bohlin (born 1965), Swedish conductor
 Ross Bohlin, former Australian politician
 Sinikka Bohlin (born 1947), Swedish social democratic politician
 Yoie Bohlin (born 1990), Swedish sportswoman

See also
 Bohlin Cywinski Jackson, United States -based architectural practice
 Bolin